Big-game hunting is the hunting of large game animals for meat, commercially valuable by-products (such as horns/antlers, furs, tusks, bones, body fat/oil, or special organs and contents), trophy/taxidermy, or simply just for recreation ("sporting"). The term is often associated with the hunting of Africa's "Big Five" games (lion, African elephant, Cape buffalo, African leopard, and rhinoceros), and with tigers and rhinoceroses on the Indian subcontinent.

History

Hunting of big game for food is an ancient practice, possibly arising with the emergence of  Homo sapiens (anatomically modern humans), and possibly pre-dating it, given the known propensity of other great apes to hunt, and even eat their own species. The Schöningen spears and their correlation of finds are evidence that complex technological skills already existed 300,000 years ago, and are the first obvious proof of an active (big game) hunt. H. heidelbergensis already had intellectual and cognitive skills like anticipatory planning, thinking and acting that so far have only been attributed to modern man. Based on cave paintings, it appears that early man hunted mammoth in groups, using a combination of spears or large rocks, or alternatively driving the animal off a cliff.

It is believed that the Clovis and Folsom cultures, ending around 8,000 BCE, were primarily big-game hunters, ending coincident with the extinction of Pleistocene megafauna.

Victorian Era
Big-game hunting is also a sport pursued to collect specimens for museums, recreation, and as a hobby.  Sharply rising in popularity during the Victorian Era, it peaked during the 20th century, and includes many famous big game hunters.  Among them are Philip Percival, who guided Theodore Roosevelt and Ernest Hemingway, themselves famous big game hunters; Bror von Blixen-Finecke, a friend of Percival's and husband of writer Isak Dinesen who wrote Out of Africa; Denys Finch Hatton, who was also a character in Dinesen's book; Major Percy Horace Gordon Powell-Cotton; and others. Many big-game hunters are also conservationists (Roosevelt and Hemingway are examples), and currently big-game hunting in Africa helps pay for conservation efforts, with very large fees from the hunters going directly to wildlife management.

Methods

Various big-game hunting methods have been developed over centuries. The main methods in use today are stalking, ambush (hunting from blinds), driving, trapping or a combination thereof. Calling and baiting may be used to increase the effectiveness of any method or combination.

The stalking method consists of following the animal until the kill can be made.  Generally hunters approach the game stealthily, camouflaging their appearance, scent or sound depending on which sense is most likely to reveal them to their prey under the conditions.  Stalks can routinely persist for days for certain game under certain conditions. Tracking game for stalking is a skill that has been learned by hunters since prehistoric times, and is used with success today.

The ambush method, including hunting from blinds, consists of setting up or finding means of cover or concealment to assist in reducing the likelihood of the game detecting the hunter while the hunter waits in ambush or approaches the prey. Ground blinds, tree stands, cocking-cloths, dugout blinds, and stand-alone structures are all used as blinds in hunting today. All of these blinds are used in the ambush method.  Cocking-cloths, or stalking blinds, are used in stalking prey but may still be considered as an ambush. Generally, baiting big-game includes the use of blinds; all the methods described herein may be used in combination.

Driving game as a hunting method is the act of directing the movement of the animal in order to kill it.  A montería is an example of this. Game may be driven to a trap; to a fall that will kill it, such as over a cliff; or to a position where the hunter may make the kill. Driving is accomplished by sending an agent, usually dogs or people, through the terrain where the animal is believed to be, and making enough noise or using other devices to push the animal to move in the desired direction.

The use of vehicles in stalking and driving game can increase hunters' range and speed, and therefore, their effectiveness. Vehicles may also be used as blinds. Ground and air vehicles have been used in hunting big game, both for scouting game location and for the stalk.

Weapons

Portable weapons used for big-game hunting include firearms, bow and arrow, spears, atlatls, and other longer-range weapons, as well as close-range, handheld weapons like hammers, axes, knives and other bladed weapons.

By far the most common weapon used by hunters is the firearm, and among firearms the most common weapon is the long-barreled rifle. Other firearms, such as shotguns and handguns, are also used in big-game hunting.

Large-caliber ammunition is considered to be most effective in taking down large game effectively and humanely. Big-game hunting ethics require a clean, humane kill, and most hunters work diligently toward this end. Advances in ammunition and the guns to match have made longer-range kills of big game possible with margins of error considered tolerable. Some common calibers and types of ammunition for big-game hunting include .30-30 Winchester, .308 Winchester, .30-06 Springfield, .300 Winchester Magnum, and .358 Winchester. The calibers and types of ammunition, and the firearms to shoot them, are numerous, and the science of ballistics is continuously improving to allow hunting in a tremendous variety of situations. Bullet weight and shape, cartridge size, powder load and type, and virtually every other variable of firearms ammunition is continuously changing.

Bow and arrow hunting is popular and effective among skilled hunters for big game. There is a variety of types of bows available, including long bows, short bows, recurve bows, compound bows and crossbows, all made of various materials. Arrows are also made from various materials including wood, fiberglass, carbon fiber and others. Arrowheads have different configurations and materials as well.

Primitive hunting using spears, atlatls and other weapons is a skill popular among hunters seeking greater challenge and knowledge than more conventional weaponry.

Hunting ethics

With greater competition among hunters and given increasingly scarce resources, the need for ethical behavior from big game hunters has increased proportionately. The Boone and Crockett Club and Pope and Young Club (for bow hunters) both promote fair chase hunting. The Spanish philosopher José Ortega y Gasset in his famous book Meditations on Hunting promoted a mindful approach to hunting. Author James Posewitz, in his book Beyond Fair Chase: The Ethic and Tradition of Hunting, wrote:

Fundamental to ethical hunting is the idea of fair chase. This concept addresses the balance between the hunter and the hunted. It is a balance that allows hunters to occasionally succeed while animals generally avoid being taken.

Another author, Allen Morris Jones, in his book A Quiet Place of Violence: Hunting and Ethics in the Missouri River Breaks, argues that hunting is right insofar as it returns us to the natural context from which we evolved, and wrong insofar as it further removes us. Even in the context of trophy hunting, we must eat what we kill, for instance, given that our evolved role was one of predation.

Economic impact 
There are examples of the economic and conservation value of big-game hunting in several places. The Bubye Valley Conservancy in Zimbabwe has successfully managed lion and rhinoceros populations through hunting fees. In North America, the State of California estimates that the economic impact of big-game hunting in that state was $263,702,757 in 2016. Also in North America, the State of Wyoming estimates that the economic impact of big-game hunting in 2015 was $224 million. The examples of large economic impacts of big-game hunting abound, and many studies exist of the high positive effects wherever it is tried and managed well.

Impact on Wildlife Conservation 
Well regulated hunting has contributed in protecting wildlife in many parts of the world. For example, due to conservation through hunting, white-tailed deer population has increased in the United States from about 500,000 in the early 1900s to 30 million today. At the beginning of the 20th century, 500,000 rhinos roamed Africa and Asia. By 1970, rhino numbers dropped to 70,000, and today, as few as 29,000 rhinos remain in the wild. Very few rhinos survive outside national parks and reserves due to persistent poaching and habitat loss over many decades. White rhinoceros is an exception as its numbers in Africa have increased from 100 in 1916 to more than 18,000 in 2016 due largely to the increase in private game reserves intended for hunting. Some hunts can generate fees of hundreds of thousands of dollars, which are then used directly for conservation, as was the case with rhinoceroses in Africa.

See also
 List of famous big game hunters
 Green hunting
 Trophy hunting

References

Further reading
 Foa, E. After Big Game in Central Africa. St. Martin's Press. .
 Herne, Brian. White Hunters: The Golden Age of African Safari, Henry Holt & Co, New York, 1999.
 "The Most Dangerous Game",  a classic story famous in the mid-twentieth century that was inspired  by and explores the philosophy of hunting for sheer pleasure.
 Hemingway, Ernest. Green Hills of Africa
 Hemingway, Ernest. True at First Light
 Roosevelt, Theodore. Good Hunting: In the Pursuit of Big Game in the West .

External links

 Rifles for Protection in the Field
 Rifles for Dangerous Game

Hunting
Hunting in the United States
Hunting in Canada

de:Großwildjagd
sv:Storviltjakt